Gao Jian is a People's Republic of China diplomat.

Gao was born in Shanghai, and is married with one son.
From 2007 to 2009 she was the People's Republic of China Ambassador  to Norway.
From August 2009 till October 2012 she was Chinese Ambassador to Hungary.

References

Ambassadors of China to Norway
Ambassadors of China to Hungary
Living people
Chinese women diplomats
Chinese women ambassadors
Year of birth missing (living people)